The Coral Bell School of Asia Pacific Affairs is a constituent of the College of Asia and the Pacific, but was formerly part of the Research School of Pacific and Asian Studies, ANU, which was founded in 1946 as part of the Institute of Advanced Studies at the Australian National University in Canberra, Australian Capital Territory. In 2015 it was renamed in honour of Coral Bell, a leading Australian scholar of international politics.

History
First known as the Research School for Pacific Studies (RSPacS), the research school began as one of the foundation schools
of the Institute of Advanced Studies at ANU. In the late 1940s Raymond Firth, an eminent international scholar from the London School of Economics, was asked to join a group of other academics to advise on the creation of the first research schools within the ANU. Other leading scholars in the group included Mark Oliphant (physical sciences), Keith Hancock (social sciences), and Nobel prize-winner Howard Florey (medical sciences). Firth was responsible for advising on regional studies, especially Pacific studies. Following the recommendations of this group, a number of research schools were established at the ANU to serve as national centres of study in Australia in the post-war period.

During the next several decades the RSPacS built up a strong international reputation for work on Pacific studies (including Papua New Guinea) and Southeast Asia. The first Director and first professor of economics in the RSPacS was Sir John Crawford. Crawford's interests in development in Asia set a direction for economics in the research school. He was also widely recognised as an excellent academic administrator who served as both Vice-Chancellor, and later Chancellor, of the ANU. The work of the research school during this period was strongly interdisciplinary. For example, as well as research in economics, international relations, human geography and anthropology in the Asia-Pacific region, another major development of the school was the creation of the Pacific Linguistics publishing unit by Professor Stephen Wurm in the early 1960s. Since the establishment of the unit, Pacific Linguistics has published several hundred volumes of dictionaries, grammars, and other linguistic studies on the Asia-Pacific region, particularly Oceania and Southeast Asia.

In the earlier form of the research school, staff of the RSPacS were frequently involved in public discussion about Pacific and Asian affairs Also the genesis of the RSPAS can be seen in comments by Bruce in 1952 Due to the earlier focus on Pacific studies, the RSPacS supported research locations with housing for visiting researchers; the Suva Flats in Fiji were one such location

For a range of reasons, including significant changes in the balance of power in Southeast Asia in the late 1960s and the following decade, during the 1970s and 1980s there was a decline in Asian regional studies in Europe and North America. Partly as a result, many scholars from North America and Europe with an interest in Asia spent time at the ANU to work within the RSPacS. Well-known scholars from North America who visited the school in the 1970s and 1980s included Professor Bruce Glassburner (economics, University of California, Davis), Professor Anne Krueger (later the chief economist of the World Bank and first deputy managing director of the International Monetary Fund), Professor Herb Grubel (Simon Fraser University, Canada), and many others.

During the 1970s and 1980s an increasing proportion of the work of the school shifted to Southeast Asia from the Pacific. Many scholarly books, journal articles and other studies were produced following research in countries such as Indonesia, Thailand, the Philippines, Vietnam, and so on. Reflecting the fact that "the balance of research activity in the School... has shifted significantly from the Pacific towards Asia in recent years and will continue to do so", in 1994 the name of the school was changed to the Research School of Pacific and Asian Studies (RSPAS) RSPAS developed along multidisciplinary lines, encompassing anthropology, archaeology, economics, history, human geography, international relations, linguistics, political science, resource management and strategic defence studies. Over time, within the overall departmental structure of the school, certain special areas of study emerged such as the Indonesia Project which focused on studies of the Indonesian economy as well as other aspects of developments in Indonesia.

At various stages internal ANU and external factors affected the school – such as in 1997 when it was announced that the school was required to reduce staff numbers

In 2010, following a major review of the organisational arrangements within the ANU, the RSPAS was reduced in status in line with other changes to other research schools across the ANU. Shortly afterwards, a new College of Asia and the Pacific was established which took over much of the work of former RSPAS.

In 2018, the school signed a memorandum of understanding with the Leverhulme Centre for the Future of Intelligence at the University of Cambridge, to collaborate on research into the risks and opportunities of artificial intelligence.

Departments and Centres
The Bell School consists of seven departments or centres.
 Asia-Pacific College of Diplomacy
 Department of International Relations
 Department of Political and Social Change
 Department of Pacific Affairs
 Strategic and Defence Studies Centre

Programs
The Bell School offers three undergraduate and six postgraduate coursework programs.

Undergraduate Program
 Bachelor of International Security Studies
 Bachelor of Asia Pacific Affairs & Bachelor of Global Liberal Arts
 Bachelor of Pacific Studies
Postgraduate Programs
 Graduate Diploma of International Affairs
 Master of Diplomacy
 Master of International Law and Diplomacy
 Master of Strategic Studies
 Master of International Relations
 Master of Political Science
 Master of Military and Defence Studies

The School also contributes undergraduate and graduate courses in International Relations, security studies, strategic studies, political science, political and social change and Asia and the Pacific studies.

Higher Degree by Research
The Bell School offers graduate research programs. Students undertake their research at one of the School's departments or centres and are awarded Master of Philosophy or Doctor of Philosophy degrees when they complete their studies.

Publications and outreach
During its existence, scholars from the RSPacS and RSPAS produced a large number of books and journal articles as well as various other publications that reported on its work and subjects within its scope. For example, one of the major achievements of the research school was the establishment of the Bulletin of Indonesian Economic Studies by Professor Heinz Arndt in the mid-1960s. Now in publication for over 40 years, the Bulletin has documented the development of the Indonesian economy and is today the leading international journal dealing with the economic development of Indonesia.

Other work on the region included support for the major annual Indonesia Update conference in Canberra where Australian and overseas experts discussed the state of development in Indonesia.  The Update conference, which is now organised within the College of Asia and the Pacific, leads to the publication of a conference volume. During the 1980s and 1990s, the RSPAS was joint publisher of the conference volume in cooperation with the Institute of Southeast Asian Studies in Singapore.

The number of linked publication series of the staff RSPAS is of considerable size covering its scope – with publications relating to Australian, Pacific, and Asian subjects. However following the change in arrangements in the ANU in 2010, some projects effectively closed down.

Pandanus Books was a publishing arm of RSPAS which produced a range of significant publications relative to south east Asian studies, it was wound down in 2006.

Internet
A significant presence for the RSPAS on the internet was the RSPAS-based work Asian Studies WWW Monitor supported by Dr T.Matthew Ciolek. The Monitor was established in April 1994 and operated until January 2011. Later, the Pacific Studies WWW Monitor (ISSN 1443-8976) modelled on the Asian Studies monitor was established in April 2000.

Conferences
Subject areas of the conferences that RSPAS conducted or shared with other bodies were extensive in their coverage of Pacific and Asian areas of interest to Australia, this also subsequently attracted researchers with experience who would go on to work in Australian government agencies or authorities, or otherwise government would co-opt RSPAS staff onto their bodies. Of significance of the government relationship between RSPAS and the government is the title of the doctoral these by van Konkelenberg who wrote about The relationship between the Australian National University's Research School of Pacific Studies and the federal government 1946–1975.

Resources 

Collections

The various divisions or sections within RSPAS had collections of materials in relation to the study areas that were on a par or complementary with that held by the National Library of Australia

Coombs Building

For much of its history, the Research School of Pacific and Asian Studies was housed in the Coombs Building, a notable architectural icon on the ANU campus. The building, named after leading Australian economist H.C. Coombs, was inaugurated on 11 September 1964. A set of interlinked hexagons –- originally two, with third added later, together with a lecture theatre and extension—the Coombs Building was the hive in which research and teaching were carried out on the Asia-Pacific region.

Directors
 Sir John Crawford, 1960–1967
 Professor Oskar Spate, 1967–1972
 Professor Anthony Low, 1973–1975
 Professor Wang Gungwu, 1975–1980
 Professor Gerard Ward, 1980–1993
 Professor Merle Ricklefs, 1993–1998
 Professor James J. Fox, 1998–2006
 Professor Robin Jeffrey, 2006–2008
 Professor Andrew MacIntyre, starting in 2008
 Professor Michael Wesley
 Professor Brendan Taylor (Acting) (2016–2018)
 Professor Toni Erskine (2018–current)

References

Further reading
 Firth, Raymond.  "The Founding of the Research School of Pacific Studies," The Journal of Pacific History, Vol. 31, No. 1 (Jun. 1996), pp. 3–7
 Foster, S.G. and Varghese, M.M. (1996). The Making of the Australian National University, 1946–1996.'' Sydney: Allen and Unwin.

External links
 Research School of Asia & the Pacific (RSAP)  website
 RSPAS related links

Educational institutions established in 1946
1946 establishments in Australia
Research institutes in Australia
Asian studies
Australian National University